Coleophora portulacae is a moth of the family Coleophoridae. It is found in the United States, including New Mexico.

The larvae feed on the leaves of Portulaca species. They create a trivalved, tubular silken case.

References

portulacae
Moths of North America
Moths described in 1898